Thymopides is a genus of deep-water lobsters, comprising the two species Thymopides grobovi and Thymopides laurentae.

Distribution
Two species are included in the genus Thymopides.

Description
Thymopides differs from related genera such as Homarus, Homarinus and Nephrops in having the first pair of pereiopods of similar size and shape, rather than one "crusher" and one "cutter" claw. It differs from others, such as Metanephrops and Eunephrops by the lack of a carina behind the antennal spine, by the smaller size of some spines and by the smaller, unpigmented eyes.

Taxonomy
The genus was first described by R. N. Burukovsky and B. S. Averin in 1976 under the name Bellator, in a paper in the Russian Journal of Zoology. After Lipke Holthuis informed the authors that a genus already existed called Bellator, they published a replacement name in a paper in the journal Crustaceana. That new name was Thymopides, referring to the close resemblance between the new genus and the genus Thymops. The original genus name, Bellator derived from the Latin word , meaning "warrior".

In 2003, a second species was described, T. laurentae, commemorating Michèle de Saint Laurent.

References

External links

True lobsters